Coney Island is a 1975 studio album by Herb Alpert & The Tijuana Brass, the second release that was billed as "Herb Alpert & The T.J.B." It followed the 1974 release of You Smile – The Song Begins. Both albums reflected personnel changes from the Brass that was disbanded after 1969's The Brass Are Comin'.

The T.J.B.
The album was said to be "a brave, nearly complete departure from the old Tijuana Brass, where the jazzers were given carte blanche and the rhythm section encouraged to do more complex things."

Legendary audio engineer Larry Levine, who engineered nearly all of the Tijuana Brass albums including Coney Island, observed that the album contained more off-beat or original tracks, that cast the band in a new and more adventurous light. He noted in particular that "'Carmine', 'Vento Bravo' and Chick Corea's 'Señor Mouse' allow the band to stretch more than the TJB of old, and emphasizing more improvisation by the group members."

In September 1974, music from Coney Island was featured in a television special with Jim Henson's  Muppets. Alpert & The T.J.B. also made an appearance to promote the album on the late night musical variety series  Midnight Special. The broadcast was essentially an A&M Records special, with additional appearances by label artists Captain & Tennille, Billy Preston, and Supertramp.

Reception
Coney Island spent ten weeks on the  Billboard Top LPs & Tape chart, reaching number 88 for the week ending June 14, 1975. It spent eight weeks on the Billboard Top 50 Easy Listening chart, where it peaked at number 19.

Personnel 
 Herb Alpert: trumpet
 Bob Edmondson: trombone
 Bob Findley: trumpet
 Dave Frishberg: piano
 Julius Wechter: marimba
 Vince Charles: steel drum/percussion
 Lani Hall: vocals
 Steve Schaeffer: drums
 Peter Woodford: guitar
 Papito Hernandez: bass

Track listing

References

1975 albums
Herb Alpert albums